Hesar-e Sefid or Hesar Sefid may refer to:
 Hesar-e Sefid, Kermanshah
 Hesar Sefid, Kurdistan